Michael Olla (born September 23, 1994) is an American professional soccer forward.

Career

Youth and college
Raised in Montclair, New Jersey, Olla played prep soccer at Saint Benedict's Preparatory School. He played college soccer at Montclair State University between 2013 and 2016.

Professional
Olla signed with United Soccer League side Harrisburg City Islanders on March 16, 2017.

References

External links

1994 births
Living people
American soccer players
People from Bloomfield, New Jersey
Penn FC players
St. Benedict's Preparatory School alumni
Association football forwards
Soccer players from New Jersey
Sportspeople from Essex County, New Jersey
USL Championship players
FC Motown players
National Premier Soccer League players